Dahiri (also spelled Dairi) is a town in southern Ivory Coast. It is a sub-prefecture of Fresco Department in Gbôklé Region, Bas-Sassandra District.

Dahiri was a commune until March 2012, when it became one of 1126 communes nationwide that were abolished.

In 2014, the population of the sub-prefecture of Dahiri was 36,591.

Villages
The xx villages of the sub-prefecture of Dahiri and their population in 2014 are:
 Dahiri (8 397) 
 Goménébéri (10 131) 
 Okromodou (13 054) 
 Zéribéri (5 009)

References

Sub-prefectures of Gbôklé